Dalea ornata, the Blue Mountain prairie clover, is a perennial subshrub or herb of the subfamily Faboideae in the pea family (Fabaceae).

It is found in the Great Basin region of the Western United States, in the states of California, Idaho, Oregon, Nevada, and Washington. Its habitats include sagebrush, rocky ridges, and sandy to shaley barrens.

References

External links
Dalea ornata at WTU Herbarium Image Collection
Photo gallery

ornata
Flora of the Great Basin
Endemic flora of the United States
Flora of California
Flora of Idaho
Flora of Nevada
Flora of Washington (state)
Flora without expected TNC conservation status